The Myrna Loy filmography presents a chronology of the motion picture and television appearances of actress Myrna Loy. All of Loy's films released prior to The Desert Song (1929) were silent except where noted. All of Loy's films were produced in the United States except for That Dangerous Age (1949), which was produced in Great Britain. Her television credits are also listed.

Film

Box office ranking

 1936 - 18th (US)
 1937 - 10th (US)
 1938 - 7th (US)
 1939 - 16th (US)
 1940 - 15th (US)
 1948 - 9th (UK)

Television

Actress filmographies
American filmographies